The women's 4 x 400 metres relay at the 1974 European Athletics Championships was held in Rome, Italy, at Stadio Olimpico on 8 September 1974.

Medalists

Results

Final
8 September

Participation
According to an unofficial count, 32 athletes from 8 countries participated in the event.

 (4)
 (4)
 (4)
 (4)
 (4)
 (4)
 (4)
 (4)

References

4 x 400 metres relay
4 x 400 metres relay at the European Athletics Championships
1974 in women's athletics